Black Rock is a barren, uninhabited island in Bristol County, Massachusetts. It has a beacon structure.

References

Fairhaven, Massachusetts
Islands of Bristol County, Massachusetts
Uninhabited islands of Massachusetts
Coastal islands of Massachusetts